Yutaka is a masculine Japanese given name.

Possible writings
Yutaka can be written using different kanji characters and can mean:

豊, "bountiful"
裕, "affluence"
穣, "fertile"
温, "warmth" 

The name can also be written in hiragana ゆたか or katakana ユタカ.

Notable people with the name
Yutaka Abe (阿部 豊), former Japanese film director and actor
, Japanese gymnast
Yutaka Akita (秋田 豊, born 1970), Japanese former football player
Yutaka Aoyama (青山 穣, born 1965), Japanese vocal actor
Yutaka Banno (伴野 豊, born 1961), Japanese politician of the Democratic Party of Japan
Yutaka Demachi (出町 豊, born 1935), Japanese volleyball player
, Japanese ice hockey player
Yutaka Enatsu (江夏 豊, born 1948), Japanese baseball pitcher
Rickie Fowler (リッキー・ユタカ・ファウラー, born 1988), Japanese-American Professional Golf Champion, named after maternal grandfather
, Japanese basketball player
Yutaka Fukufuji (福藤 豊, born 1982), the first Japanese-born player to appear in a National Hockey League game
Yutaka Fukumoto (福本 豊, born 1947), professional baseball player
Yutaka Fukushima (福島 豊, born 1958), Japanese politician of the New Komeito Party
Yutaka Haniya (埴谷 雄高, 1909–1997), Japanese author
Yutaka Higuchi (樋口 豊, born 1949), Japanese figure skater
Yutaka Higuchi (桶口 豊, born 1967), bassist for the Japanese rock band BUCK-TICK
Yutaka Hirose (広瀬 裕, born 1962), Japanese actor and voice actor
, Japanese footballer
Yutaka Ishinabe (石鍋 裕, born 1948), the first French Chef in the Japanese cooking show Iron Chef
Yutaka Izubuchi (出渕 裕, born 1958), Japanese illustrator, anime designer and director
Yutaka Kagaya (加賀谷 穣, born 1968), Japanese digital artist
Yutaka Kanai (金井 豊, 1959–1990), Japanese long-distance runner
Yutaka Katayama (片山 豊, born 1909), the first president of Nissan Motor Company in U.S.A
, Japanese ice hockey player
Yutaka Kisenosato (稀勢の里 寛, born 1986), sumo wrestler (born Yutaka Hagiwara 萩原 寛)
Yutaka Mafune (真船 豊, 1902–1977), playwright in Showa period Japan
Yutaka Matsushige (松重 豊, born 1963), Japanese actor
Yutaka Minowa (箕輪 豊, born 1965), character designer and animation director who works with Madhouse
Yutaka Mizutani (水谷 豊, born 1952), Japanese actor and singer
, Japanese animator
Yutaka Niida (新井田 豊, born 1978), professional minimumweight boxer
Yutaka Ohno (大野 豊, born 1955), former Japanese baseball player
Yutaka Ozaki (尾崎 豊, 1965–1992), popular Japanese musician
Yutaka Sado (佐渡 裕, born 1961), Japanese conductor
Yutaka Tahara (田原 豊, born 1982), Japanese football player
Yutaka Takanashi (高梨 豊, born 1935), Japanese photographer who photographed fashion, urban design, and city life
Yutaka Take (武 豊, born 1969), Japanese jockey
Yutaka Takenouchi (竹野内 豊, born 1971), Japanese actor
Yutaka Taniyama (谷山 豊, 1927–1958), Japanese mathematician
Yutaka Wada (和田 豊, born 1962), former Japanese baseball player
Yutaka Yaguchi (矢口 豊, born 1932), Chief Instructor and Chairman of the International Shotokan Karate Federation
, Japanese composer
Yutaka Yamaguchi (山口 泰, born 1940), member of the Group of Thirty
Yutaka Yamamoto (山本 寛, born 1974), Japanese animation director
Yutaka Yokokura (横倉 裕, born 1956), Japanese jazz musician
, Japanese footballer
Yutaka Yoshie (吉江 豊, born 1974), Japanese professional wrestler

Fictional characters
Yutaka Kobayakawa (小早川 ゆたか), character in the anime series Lucky Star
Yutaka Kobayashi (小林 温)), Megatokyo character
Yutaka Seto (瀬戸 豊), character in the novel, film and manga Battle Royale
Yutaka Tamaru (多丸 裕), minor character in the Suzumiya Haruhi franchise
Yutaka Kazami (風見 豊), character in the Gyakuten Saiban
Yutaka Kono (河野 豊), character in the Darker than Black

See also
Yutaka, Hiroshima, town located in Toyota District of Hiroshima, Japan
Fukuhoku Yutaka Line, four sections of railway line in Fukuoka Prefecture, Kyūshū, Japan
Yutaka (video game company), the name of a Japanese-only video game company

Japanese masculine given names